The Aguardente de Medronhos is a strong spirit, a traditional fruit brandy from Portugal, obtained from arbutus berries - the fruit of the Medronho tree, Arbutus unedo - also called strawberry tree. The Arbutus unedo grow wild on the poor soils in rural regions of Portugal such as Lousã and the inner Algarve (in such places like Marmelete and São Marcos da Serra).

There was no large-scale commercial plantation of Arbutus unedo until the 21st century and in the past the arbutus berries were mainly collected by local farmers, by hand and processed privately. Therefore, good Aguardente de Medronhos was not easily found in supermarkets but instead bought mostly directly from these farmers. Very few farmers had a license for distillation, but they were tolerated by the authorities to keep this traditional Portuguese specialty alive.

A commercial derivative, sweetened with honey and flavoured with herbs, is sold under the brand names Brandymel and Dom Cristina.

Aguardente de Medronhos is also known as 'firewater' to non-Portuguese speakers. It is a rough translation from água ardente, which is Portuguese for burning water. The spirit obtains this name from the hot sensation as the consumed beverage travels down the throat and is felt through the sinuses.

The alcohol content of the beverage can vary; however, many bottles of Aguardente de Medronhos contain around 48% alcohol by volume. The beverage is consumed in shot-glass sized portions.

External links 
 A blog about the tree and the liquor (Portuguese)

References 

Portuguese distilled drinks
Brandies
Arbutus